The Yellow Turban Rebellion, alternatively translated as the Yellow Scarves Rebellion, was a peasant revolt in China against the Eastern Han dynasty. The uprising broke out in March 184 CE during the reign of Emperor Ling. Although the main rebellion was suppressed by 185 CE, it took 21 years for full suppression of resistant areas and emerging rebellions by 205 CE. The rebellion, which got its name from the color of the rebel headwear, marked an important point in the history of Taoism due to the rebels' association with secret Taoist societies. The revolt was also used as the opening event in the 14th-century historical novel Romance of the Three Kingdoms.

Causes

The Han Dynasty's central government was weakened by court eunuchs abusing their power over the emperor to enrich themselves. Twelve of the most powerful eunuchs were referred to as the Ten Attendants with Emperor Ling once claiming that "Regular Attendant Zhang Rang is my father and Regular Attendant Zhao Zhong is my mother". The government corruption was perceived as causing plagues, natural disasters, and poor agricultural yields, reflecting that the emperor had lost his Mandate of Heaven.

As flooding along the Yellow River forced farmers and military settlers south, the labor surplus incentivized exploitation. Disease outbreaks were reported in 171, 173, 179, 182, and 185 CE, with the potential cause theorized as the Antonine Plague of 165 to 180CE of smallpox or measles spreading along the Silk Road.

Through claims of providing curative water and bamboo playing, the Taoist leader Zhang Jue developed his initial following to send his disciples throughout northern China in preparation for a revolt. Their rapid rise was relatively unnoticed until they become too powerful to challenge. Zhang Jue intended to launch an uprising throughout the Han Empire, but the plan was betrayed before he was ready. Rebel sympathizers in Luoyang were arrested and executed, forcing a premature beginning in March 184. Despite the inevitable lack of co-ordination and overall preparation, tens of thousands of men rose in rebellion. Government offices were plundered and destroyed and the imperial armies were immediately forced on the defensive.

Rebels

Founders
The rebellion was led by Zhang Jue (also referred to as Zhang Jiao, known to his followers as the "General of Heaven") and his two younger brothers Zhang Bao and Zhang Liang, who were born in Julu Commandery. The brothers had founded a Taoist religious sect in present-day Shandong, praised as healers who offered free care to impoverished patients. Recognizing how the local government abused the peasant class through harsh labor and heavy taxes, they plotted rebellion.

Taoist sect
The rebels were the first followers of the Way of Supreme Peace and venerated the deity Huang–Lao, who according to Zhang Jue, had given him a sacred book called the Crucial Keys to the Way of Peace based on the Taipingjing. Zhang Jue, who was said to be a sorcerer, called himself the "Great Teacher". When the rebellion was proclaimed, Zhang Jue created a 16-word slogan spread through the brothers' medical work:

Religious practices
Zhang Jue claimed to cure patients by having them confess sins for Taoist faith healing. The Zhang brothers believed in an impending apocalyptic change in the jiazi year, the beginning of the new sexagenary cycle, involving yellow skies marking new governance, which inspired the color of their headwear. Through the sect's communal activities like trances, fasting, musical performances, chanting, incense burning, and sermons, followers united across ethnic and gender lines. Several Xiongnu leaders, such as Yufuluo, lent their support, potentially inspiring Zhang Jue to adopt their shamanistic beliefs.

Despite few surviving records, the early Path of Supreme Peace was likely similar to the Way of the Celestial Masters, considering that Zhang Jue claimed to be a descendant of Zhang Daoling. Much of the Taipingjing's surviving 52 chapters, found in the Daozang, have a direct relationship to the Way of the Celestial Masters with discrepancies potentially suppressed by later Taoists.

Zhang Jue's plans for rebellion

Before the rebellion started, Zhang Jue had sent Ma Yuanyi to recruit followers from Jing and Yang provinces and gather them in Ye. Since Ma Yuanyi frequently traveled to Luoyang, the Han imperial capital, he was able to persuade Feng Xu and Xu Feng, members of the imperial court's eunuch faction, to secretly collaborate with Zhang Jue. They set 3 April 184 as the date for the rebellion, but before the plans was set in motion, the Yellow Turbans were betrayed. One of the founders of "The Way of Peace" movement, Tang Zhou had been excluded from later planning, so he reported Ma Yuanyi to the authorities. Ma Yuanyi was arrested and executed by dismemberment in Luoyang.

After Emperor Ling learned that Zhang Jue was plotting a revolt, he ordered Zhou Bin, Prefect of the Palace Parks, to conduct an investigation and capture all the conspirators. Hundreds of people were arrested and executed during this time.

Yellow Rebellion
When Zhang Jue heard that the Han government had caught wind about his plans to rebel, he quickly sent messengers to contact his allies throughout China and take action immediately. Sometime between 29 February and 29 March 184, Zhang Jue started the Yellow Turban Rebellion with roughly 360,000 followers wearing yellow headscarves or turbans. He called himself the "Lord General of Heaven", while his brothers Zhang Bao and Zhang Liang were called the "Lord General of Earth" and "Lord General of People", respectively. The rebels attacked government offices, pillaged villages, and seized control of commanderies. Within 10 days, the rebellion had spread throughout China, alarming the Han imperial court in Luoyang.

The rebels were mostly concentrated in the Ji, Jing, You and Yu provinces. The group led by Zhang Jue and his brothers gained their support in Ji Province, located just north of the Yellow River, near Zhang Jue's home territory of Julu Commandery (around present-day Pingxiang County, Hebei) and Wei Commandery (around present-day Handan, Hebei). A second major uprising took place in Guangyang Commandery (around present-day Beijing) and Zhuo Commandery (around present-day Zhuozhou, Hebei) in You Province. The third centre of the rebellion was in Yingchuan Commandery (around present-day Xuchang, Henan) and Runan Commandery (around present-day Xinyang, Henan) in Yu Province, and Nanyang Commandery (around present-day Nanyang, Henan) in northern Jing Province.

On 1 April 184, Emperor Ling appointed his brother-in-law He Jin, the Intendant of Henan, as General-in-Chief and ordered him to supervise the imperial armies in suppressing the rebellion. Emperor Ling also appointed three generals – Lu Zhi, Huangfu Song and Zhu Jun – to lead three separate armies to deal with the rebels with a total of roughly 40,000 troops. Lu Zhi went for Zhang Jue's base in Ji Province, while Huangfu Song and Zhu Jun headed to Yingchuan Commandery.

You Province: Guangyang and Zhuo commanderies
In You Province, the rebels killed Guo Xun, the provincial Inspector, and Liu Wei, the Administrator of Guangyang Commandery.

Zou Jing, a colonel, led imperial forces to eliminate the rebels in You Province. Liu Bei led a group of volunteers to assist him.

Yu Province: Runan and Yingchuan commanderies
When the rebellion first broke out in Yu Province, the Han imperial court specially selected Wang Yun to be the inspector of the province to oversee the military operations.

Zhao Qian, the administrator of Runan Commandery, led his troops to attack the rebels before Zhu Jun arrived, but was defeated at Shaoling (in present-day southeastern Henan). When Chen County (present-day Huaiyang County, Henan) was under attack by the rebels, seven of Zhao Qian's subordinates, who were non-military personnel, armed themselves with swords and attempted to fight the rebels but were all killed. Later, after the rebellion was suppressed, Emperor Ling issued an edict to honor the seven as the "Seven Virtuous".

Chen State (around present-day Zhoukou, Henan), one of the commanderies in Yu Province, avoided the Yellow Turban Rebellion's bloodshed because the rebels feared Prince Liu Chong, famous for his unit of skilled archers.

The rebels in Runan Commandery, led by Bo Cai, initially defeated Zhu Jun in battle and drove him back. The imperial court sent a cavalry commandant, led by young officer Cao Cao, as reinforcements for Zhu Jun. Sometime between 28 May and 25 June, Zhu Jun, Huangfu Song, and Cao Cao joined forces to defeat Bo Cai at Changshe (east of present-day Changge, Henan). While Bo Cai attempted to flee, Huangfu Song and Zhu Jun pursued him to Yangzhai County (陽翟縣; present-day Yuzhou, Henan) and defeated him again, causing the rebels to scatter.

Huangfu Song and Zhu Jun then defeated the rebels in Runan Commandery, led by Peng Tuo, at Xihua County (south of present-day Xihua County, Henan). The imperial court ordered them to split up: Huangfu Song would attack the rebels at Dong Commandery (東郡; around present-day Puyang County, Henan), while Zhu Jun would attack the rebels at Nanyang Commandery. During this time, Wang Yun, the Inspector of Yu Province, found evidence that the rebels had been secretly maintaining contact with Zhang Rang, the leader of the eunuch faction in Luoyang, so he reported it to Emperor Ling, who scolded Zhang Rang but did not punish him.

Between 7 November and 6 December, Bao Hong, a colonel, led imperial forces to attack the rebels in Gebei (northwest of present-day Xincai County, Henan) and defeated them.

Ji Province: Wei and Julu commanderies
In the meantime, Lu Zhi defeated Zhang Jue's rebel forces in Julu Commandery and besieged the rebel leader in Guangzong County (southeast of present-day Guangzong County, Hebei). However, after a eunuch falsely accused Lu Zhi of treason, Emperor Ling ordered his arrest, escorted back to Luoyang as a prisoner. The imperial court then sent General Dong Zhuo to take over Lu Zhi's position and attack Zhang Jue. However, Dong Zhuo failed and retreated.

On 23 or 24 September, Huangfu Song and Fu Xie, a Major under him, defeated the rebels at Cangting (north of present-day Yanggu County, Shandong), captured their leader Bu Ji (卜己), and killed over 7,000 rebels, including other minor leaders Zhang Bo and Liang Zhongning. On 25 September, the imperial court ordered him to replace Dong Zhuo and lead his troops north to Guangzong County and attack Zhang Jue.

Zhang Jue died of illness while under attack by Huangfu Song in Guangzong County. Between 21 November and 20 December, Huangfu Song kept attacking Zhang Liang, who had taken over command of his brother's followers at Guangzong County. Unable to defeat Zhang Liang's skilled Yellow Turbans, Huangfu Song switched to a defensive approach, tricking the rebels into lowering their guard for a devastating nighttime strike. Zhang Liang was killed in action alongside 30,000 rebels, while another 50,000 rebels drowned while attempting to flee across a river. Huangfu Song burnt over 30,000 carts containing rebel supplies and captured most of their family members. Huangfu Song then had Zhang Jue's body excavated and decapitated, sending his head to the imperial court in Luoyang.

In recognition of Huangfu Song's achievements, Emperor Ling promoted him to Left General of Chariots and Cavalry. Between 21 December 184 and 18 January 185, Huangfu Song joined forces with Guo Dian, the Administrator of Julu Commandery, to attack the remaining rebels led by Zhang Jue's other brother, Zhang Bao. They defeated the rebels at Xiaquyang County (west of present-day Jinzhou, Hebei), killed Zhang Bao, and received the surrender of over 100,000 rebels.

Jing Province: Nanyang Commandery
On 24 March 184, the rebels led by Zhang Mancheng killed Chu Gong, the Administrator of Nanyang Commandery, and occupied the commandery's capital, Wancheng (present-day Wancheng District, Nanyang, Henan). Chu Gong's successor, Qin Jie, rallied local forces in Nanyang Commandery to attack Zhang Mancheng and defeated and killed him between 26 June and 25 July, before Zhu Jun's reinforcements arrived.

After Zhang Mancheng's death, Zhao Hong became the new rebel leader in Wancheng. During or after October 184, Qin Jie and Zhu Jun combined forces with Xu Qiu, the Inspector of Jing Province, to attack Wancheng with an army of about 18,000. They defeated and killed Zhao Hong.

Following Zhao Hong's death, Han Zhong and the remaining rebels seized control of Wancheng, continuing to resist imperial forces. Zhu Jun ordered his troops to pretend to attack from the southwest, while he secretly led 5,000 elite soldiers to infiltrate Wancheng from the northeast. Han Zhong retreated into the citadel and requested to surrender. Qin Jie, Xu Qiu and Zhang Chao, a Major under Zhu Jun, all urged Zhu Jun to accept Han Zhong's surrender, but he refused. Zhu Jun instead pretended to lift the siege to lure Han Zhong to come out and attack. Han Zhong fell for the ruse, lost the battle, and tried to flee north while some 10,000 of his men were slaughtered by imperial forces. In desperation, Han Zhong surrendered to Zhu Jun, but Qin Jie had him executed.

On 11 January 185, Zhu Jun defeated another rebel force led by Sun Xia, who then fled towards Xi'e County (north of present-day Nanyang, Henan). Zhu Jun pursued him there, defeated him and caused the remaining rebels to disperse.

Xu and Yang provinces
In Xu Province, the provincial Inspector Tao Qian, with the aid of Zang Ba, managed to defeat the rebels to restore regional peace.

Sun Jian, then a minor official serving in Xiapi County (south of present-day Pizhou, Jiangsu) in Xu Province, came to join Zhu Jun's army as a Major. He brought along several young men from Xiapi County and other soldiers recruited from the Huai River region.

In Yang Province, the rebels attacked Shu County (in present-day central Anhui), a county in Lujiang Commandery (around present-day Lu'an, Anhui), and set fire to buildings. Yang Xu, the Administrator of Lujiang Commandery, successfully rallied thousands of able-bodied men aged 19 and above for countering the attack and firefighting.

End of the rebellion
By the beginning of 185, the rebellion had mostly been suppressed following Zhu Jun's recapture of Wancheng in Nanyang Commandery and Huangfu Song's victories over the Zhang brothers in Ji Province. The remaining, scattered rebels were pursued by government forces in smaller military campaigns, and by mid-February 185, Emperor Ling issued a celebratory proclamation by changing his era name from Guanghe to Zhongping ("pacification achieved").

Resurgent Yellow Turban activities after early 185
Although the main Yellow Turban Rebellion ended by February 185, smaller rebellions by Yellow Turban remnants continued over the following two decades.

White Wave Bandits
Between 16 March and 13 April 188, Guo Tai led some 100,000 Yellow Turban remnants to start a rebellion in Xihe Commandery (around present-day Fenyang, Shanxi). As they originated from Baibo Valley (白波谷; "White Wave Valley") in Xihe Commandery, they later became known as the "White Wave Bandits" (白波賊). They allied with the Xiongnu leader Yufuluo and attacked Taiyuan Commandery (around present-day Taiyuan, Shanxi) and Hedong Commandery (around present-day Yuncheng, Shanxi). Between 27 October and 25 November 189, when the bandits attacked Hedong Commandery, the warlord Dong Zhuo's attempt at sending his son-in-law Niu Fu to lead attacking troops failed.

Around mid-195, Emperor Xian fled from the imperial capital Chang'an, where he had been held hostage by Dong Zhuo's followers, led by Li Jue and Guo Si, since Dong Zhuo's death in 192. He returned to the ruins of the old imperial capital Luoyang, which Dong Zhuo burnt down in 191 while forcefully relocating its residents to Chang'an. Dong Cheng (a former subordinate of Niu Fu) and Yang Feng (a former White Wave bandit) protected Emperor Xian in Luoyang when Li Jue and Guo Si tried to pursue and bring the emperor back to Chang'an. Dong Cheng and Yang Feng summoned the White Wave Bandits, led by Li Le, Han Xian, Hu Cai and others, to come to Emperor Xian's aid. Xiongnu forces led by Qubei (去卑) also responded to the call and came to help Emperor Xian resist Li Jue and Guo Si's forces. Between 195 and 196, the warlord Cao Cao led his forces into Luoyang and escorted Emperor Xian to his own base in Xu (許; present-day Xuchang, Henan) and established the new imperial capital there.

Yi Province: Ma Xiang and Zhao Zhi
In 188, Ma Xiang and Zhao Zhi led Yellow Turban remnants to start a rebellion in Yi Province (covering present-day Sichuan and Chongqing). They killed Li Sheng (Prefect of Mianzhu County ), Zhao Bu (Administrator of Ba Commandery ) and Xi Jian (Inspector of Yi Province). Ma Xiang declared himself emperor before this sect of the rebellion was suppressed by local forces led by Jia Long, a former subordinate of Xi Jian.

Qing Province: Zhang Rao, Guan Hai, Xu He and Sima Ju
Around 189, Zhang Rao led some 200,000 Yellow Turban remnants to ravage Qing Province. He defeated imperial forces under Kong Rong, the Han-appointed Chancellor of Beihai State (around present-day Weifang, Shandong) in Qing Province. Later, Kong Rong was besieged in Duchang County (present-day Changyi, Shandong) by thousands of Yellow Turban rebels led by Guan Hai. Taishi Ci, then a military officer under Kong Rong, managed to break out of the siege and seek help from Liu Bei, who was then the Chancellor of the nearby Pingyuan State. Liu Bei brought along 3,000 troops to attack Guan Hai and succeeded in saving Kong Rong.

In the 200s, Xu He and Sima Ju led Yellow Turban remnants from Jinan Commandery (around present-day Zhangqiu, Shandong) and Le'an Commandery (around present-day Zibo, Shandong) respectively to ravage Qing Province. They were defeated and killed by Xiahou Yuan, Zang Ba and Lü Qian some time between 206 and 209.

Yan Province: Cao Cao's Qingzhou Army
Around May 192, hundreds of thousands of Yellow Turban remnants from Qing Province swarmed into Yan Province and killed Zheng Sui, the Chancellor of Rencheng State (around present-day Zoucheng, Shandong), before moving into Dongping Commandery (around present-day Dongping County, Shandong). Liu Dai, the Inspector of Yan Province, wanted to lead his troops to attack the rebels but the general Bao Xin advised him against it. Liu Dai ignored this advice, dying in his attack against the rebels. Bao Xin and another official, Wan Qian, went to Dong Commandery (around present-day Puyang, Henan) to invite Cao Cao to be the new Governor of Yan Province. Bao Xin then led government forces to attack the rebels at the east of Shouzhang County (south of present-day Dongping County, Shandong) but was killed in action. Later, despite having fewer troops, Cao Cao managed to defeat the rebels in Jibei State. The rebels, numbering over 300,000, surrendered to Cao Cao along with their families. Cao Cao then recruited their best warriors and organised them to form an elite military unit, the Qingzhou Army (also translated as "Qingzhou Corps").

Runan and Yingchuan commanderies: He Yi, Liu Pi, Gong Du and others
In Runan Commandery and Yingchuan Commandery, thousands of Yellow Turban remnants remained active under the leadership of He Yi, Liu Pi, Huang Shao, and He Man. They were initially allied with the warlords Yuan Shu and Sun Jian, but became an independent force in the 190s. Between 17 March and 15 April 196, the warlord Cao Cao led his forces to attack them and killed Liu Pi, Huang Shao, and He Man. He Yi led the remaining forces in surrendering to Cao Cao.

Other Yellow Turban forces in Runan Commandery were led by Wu Ba and Gong Du. Wu Ba was defeated and captured by the general Li Tong. Gong Du posed a threat to Cao Cao when he allied with Cao Cao's rival, Liu Bei, and seized control of Runan Commandery in 201. Cao Cao first sent Cai Yang to eliminate them, but after Cai Yang was killed, he personally led his troops to attack and defeat them. Liu Bei fled south to join Liu Biao, while Gong Du and the remaining rebels dispersed.

Yang and Jiao provinces
Another Yellow Turban remnant force was active in Kuaiji Commandery (around present-day Shaoxing, Zhejiang) until Liu Zan killed its leader Wu Huan.

In the 200s, Chen Bai and Wan Cheng started a rebellion in Jiuzhen Commandery (present-day Thanh Hóa Province, Vietnam). In 202, they were defeated and captured by Zhu Zhi, the commandery's administrator.

Aftermath and impact
The Han armies were victorious, despite the destruction of major government buildings, deaths of high-ranking officials, and fragmentation of the dynasty's territory. Rebel deaths numbered in the hundreds of thousands, while many non-combatants had been left homeless or destitute by the wars Heavily weakened, the Han Dynasty was unable to fully govern, distributing its powers to military commanders and local leaders until its complete collapse by 220 CE.

After Emperor Ling died in 189, a power struggle between his brother-in-law He Jin and the eunuchs culminated in He Jin's assassination on 22 September 189. He Jin's chief ally, Yuan Shao, retaliated by setting the palace on fire and slaughtering the eunuchs. The warlord Dong Zhuo gained control over the underage heir, Liu Bian, to legitimize his occupation and ransacking of the capital. Dong Zhuo was murdered for his cruelty in 192, allowing the warlord Cao Cao to seize power.

Involved parties
Yellow Turban rebels

 Zhang Jue, overall leader of the rebellion, stationed in Wei and Julu commanderies
  Zhang Bao (張寶), Zhang Jue's younger brother
  Zhang Liang (張梁), Zhang Jue's younger brother
  Bu Ji (卜己), leader of the rebels at Cangting
  Zhang Bo (張伯)
  Liang Zhongning (梁仲寧)
  Zhang Mancheng (張曼成), leader of the rebels in Nanyang Commandery
  Zhao Hong (趙弘)
  Han Zhong (韓忠)
 Sun Xia (孫夏)
 Bo Cai (波才), leader of the rebels in Runan and Yingchuan commanderies
 Peng Tuo (彭脫)
  Ma Yuanyi (馬元義)
 Tang Zhou (唐周)

Han imperial forces

 Emperor Ling
 He Jin, General-in-Chief (大將軍)
 Lu Zhi, North General of the Household (北中郎將)
 Huangfu Song, Left General of the Household (左中郎將)
 Fu Xie (傅燮), Major (司馬)
 Zhu Jun, Right General of the Household (右中郎將)
 Zhang Chao (張超), Major (司馬)
 Sun Jian, Major (司馬)
 Dong Zhuo, General of the Household (中郎將)
 Cao Cao, Cavalry Commandant (騎都尉)
 Bao Hong (鮑鴻), Colonel (校尉)
 Guo Dian (郭典), Administrator of Julu Commandery
 Xu Qiu (徐璆), Inspector of Jing Province
  Chu Gong (褚貢), Administrator of Nanyang Commandery
 Qin Jie (秦頡), Administrator of Nanyang Commandery
 Tao Qian, Inspector of Xu Province
 Zang Ba, Cavalry Commandant (騎都尉).
 Yang Xu (羊續), Administrator of Lujiang Commandery
  Guo Xun (郭勳), Inspector of You Province
  Liu Wei (劉衛), Administrator of Guangyang Commandery
 Zou Jing, Colonel (校尉)
 Liu Bei
 Wang Yun, Inspector of Yu Province
 Zhao Qian (趙謙), Administrator of Runan Commandery (汝南郡)
  Yuan Mi (袁祕), yisheng (議生; scholar)
  Feng Guan (封觀), Officer of Merit (功曹)
  Chen Duan (陳端), Registrar (主簿)
  Fan Zhongli (范仲禮), a menxiadu (門下督; patrol officer)
  Liu Weide (劉偉德), zeicao (賊曹; law enforcement officer)
  Ding Zisi (丁子嗣), zhujishi (主記史; historian)
  Zhang Zhongran (張仲然), a jishishi (記室史; scribe/note-taker)
 Liu Chong (劉寵), Prince of Chen

Resurgent Yellow Turban rebels

  Ma Xiang (馬相), started a rebellion in Yi Province in 188
 Zhao Zhi (趙祗)
 Zhang Rao (張饒), attacked and defeated Kong Rong in Qing Province around 189
 Guan Hai (管亥), attacked and besieged Kong Rong in Duchang County around 189 or 190, but was defeated by Liu Bei
  Wu Huan (吳桓), active in Kuaiji Commandery
  He Yi (何儀), led rebels in the 190s in Runan Commandery
  Liu Pi (劉辟)
  Huang Shao (黃邵)
  He Man (何曼)
 Gong Du (共都/龔都), active in Runan Commandery, allied with Liu Bei in 201
  Wu Ba (吳霸), active in Runan Commandery
  Xu He (徐和), led rebels in the 200s in Jinan Commandery
  Sima Ju (司馬俱), led rebels in the 200s in Le'an Commandery
  Chen Bai (陳敗), led rebels in the 200s in Jiuzhen Commandery
  Wan Cheng (萬秉)
 White Wave Bandits
 Guo Tai (郭太), started a rebellion in 188 in Xihe Commandery. This group of rebels became the White Wave Bandits
 Yang Feng, became a subordinate of Li Jue. He protected Emperor Xian from Li Jue and Guo Si in 195
 Li Le (李樂), along with Han Xian, Hu Cai and others, came to Emperor Xian's defence in Luoyang in 195
 Han Xian
 Hu Cai (胡才)

In Romance of the Three Kingdoms
The rebellion is portrayed in the opening chapters of the 14th-century historical novel Romance of the Three Kingdoms, which portrays the Zhang brothers as sorcerers, having been provided the Taiping Jing from the "old immortal spirit from the southern lands" (sometimes identified as Zhuangzi).

Many fictional Yellow Turban figures were created for the novel, including:
 Du Yuan, killed by Liao Hua for kidnapping Liu Bei's wives
 Zhou Cang, Guan Yu's rebel-turned-weapon bearer
 Gao Sheng, a subordinate of Zhang Bao
 Cheng Yuanzhi, defeated by Liu Bei's forces in their first engagement
 Deng Mao, Cheng Yuanzhi's champion
 Bian Xi, an eventual servant of Cao Cao who tried and failed to kill Guan Yu

Though not a fictional character, Liao Hua was presented in the novel as having been a Yellow Turban rebel in his earlier days, which is historically unlikely, given his date of death and predicted lifespan.

In popular culture
The rebellion appears as an early stage in each iteration of Koei's Dynasty Warriors video game franchise, remaining largely unchanged throughout the series. He Yi, Gong Du, and Huang Shao lead playable factions in the Yellow Turban DLC of the turn-based strategy video game Total War: Three Kingdoms, while the Mandate of Heaven DLC features Zhang Jue, Zhang Bao, and Zhang Liang.

Notes

References

 Chen, Shou (third century). Records of the Three Kingdoms (Sanguozhi).
 Fan, Ye (fifth century). Book of the Later Han (Houhanshu).
 Luo, Guanzhong (14th century). Romance of the Three Kingdoms (Sanguo Yanyi).
 Sima, Guang (1084). Zizhi Tongjian.

 
180s conflicts
190s conflicts
200s conflicts
2nd-century rebellions
3rd-century rebellions
Rebellions during the end of the Han dynasty
Peasant revolts
History of Taoism
Apocalypticism
Romance of the Three Kingdoms